Coryphothamnus is a monotypic genus of flowering plants in the family Rubiaceae. The genus contains only one species, viz. Coryphothamnus auyantepuiensis, which is endemic to southern Venezuela.

References

External links
Kew World Checklist of Selected Plant Families, Coryphothamnus

Monotypic Rubiaceae genera
Endemic flora of Venezuela
Rubioideae